Chugaynov Khutor is a rural locality (a settlement) in Ust-Zulinskoye Rural Settlement, Yurlinsky District, Perm Krai, Russia. The population was 169 as of 2010. There are 4 streets.

Geography 
Chugaynov Khutor is located 37 km east of Yurla (the district's administrative centre) by road. Pozh is the nearest rural locality.

References 

Rural localities in Yurlinsky District